Craig Campbell (born February 10, 1979) is an American country music singer. He signed to Bigger Picture Music Group and has released two albums: Craig Campbell (2011) and Never Regret (2013). He has had eight singles on the country chart.

Biography

Early years
Craig Campbell was born in Lyons, Georgia. He grew up as one of five children in a blended family. His parents divorced when he was young, leaving his oldest sister—11 years his elder—to take care of the siblings while his mom worked many jobs. His mother married his stepfather when Craig was 7. He saw his biological father every other weekend until his dad died when he was 11. He played piano at his mother's church from age 10 to 18, and formed a band called Out of the Blue as a teenager. He also won contests sponsored by True Value Hardware at 15 and at 18.

2010–2014: Craig Campbell and Never Regret
In 2002, Craig Campbell moved to Nashville, Tennessee, where he found several musician jobs. He also recorded demos and began writing songs after fellow singer Luke Bryan persuaded him. Campbell also gained a gig playing in Tracy Byrd's road band.

Campbell signed to Bigger Picture Music Group and released his debut single, "Family Man", on July 26, 2010. It was included on an extended play titled Five Spot and on his self-titled debut album, which was released on April 5, 2011. "Family Man" reached the Top 20 of the Billboard Hot Country Songs chart with a peak of number 14 in April 2011. The album's second single, "Fish", released to country radio in June 2011, and reached number 23 in October 2011. "When I Get It" peaked at 38 in early 2012.

Campbell released his fourth single, "Outta My Head", in late 2012. The song was included on a second extended play of the same name and also appears on his second studio album, Never Regret, released on May 7, 2013. The album's second single, "Keep Them Kisses Comin'", was released to country radio on December 2, 2013, and would become his biggest hit. In May 2014, it was announced that Bigger Picture would be closing. Campbell was the label's most commercially successful artist. Despite the label's closure, Campbell called radio stations and asked them to continue playing the song, resulting in it staying on the charts six weeks after the label's closure in addition to reaching the top 10.

2014–present: See You Try EP  
On December 1, 2014, Campbell announced he had signed with Red Bow Records.<ref>{{Cite web|url=http://www.billboard.com/articles/columns/the-615/6334694/exclusive-craig-campbell-signs-to-red-bow-records|title=Exclusive: 'Keep Them Kisses Comin Singer Craig Campbell Signs to Red Bow Records|date=December 1, 2014|website=Billboard.com|accessdate=2020-04-03}}</ref> His first single for the label, "Tomorrow Tonight", was released to country radio on May 19, 2015, and it reached a peak of number 39 on the Billboard Country Airplay chart. It was followed by "Outskirts of Heaven", which was released on April 11, 2016. It reached a peak of number 24 on the Billboard Country Airplay chart in early 2017, but no album was released. On April 9, 2018, Campbell released "See You Try," his third single under Red Bow. Both "Outskirts of Heaven" and "See You Try" were featured on his seven-song EP, See You Try'', which was released on June 8, 2018. Campbell parted ways with Wheelhouse in February 2019.

Discography

Studio albums

Extended plays

Singles

Guest singles

Music videos

References

External links

Official website

1979 births
Living people
People from Lyons, Georgia
Musicians from Nashville, Tennessee
American country singer-songwriters
Bigger Picture Music Group artists
BBR Music Group artists
Singer-songwriters from Tennessee
21st-century American singers
Country musicians from Tennessee
Country musicians from Georgia (U.S. state)
Singer-songwriters from Georgia (U.S. state)